Teacher Retirement System of Texas (TRS) is a public pension plan of the State of Texas. Established in 1937, TRS provides retirement and related benefits for those employed by the public schools, colleges, and universities supported by the State of Texas and manages a $180 billion trust fund established to finance member benefits. More than 1.6 million public education and higher education employees and retirees participate in the system. TRS is the largest public retirement system in Texas in both membership and assets and the sixth largest public pension fund in America. The agency is headquartered at 1000 Red River Street in the capital city of Austin.

A Board of Trustees governs the retirement system.
The Board is composed of nine trustees who are appointed to staggered terms of six years. Three trustees are direct appointments of the Governor. Two trustees are appointed by the governor from a list prepared by the State Board of Education. Two trustees are appointed by the governor from the three public school district active member candidates who have been nominated for each position by employees of public school districts. One trustee is appointed by the governor from the three retired member candidates who are nominated by retired TRS members. Beginning with the 2017 election, the former higher education trustee position on the board became an “open” seat. TRS retirees, members of public school districts and members of higher education institutions are eligible to run for nomination to this trustee position. The top three vote recipients’ names will then be submitted to the governor for appointment.

The Executive Director of TRS is Brian Guthrie.  The budget requested for the 2018-19 biennium is $4.8 billion USD.

History

The effort to establish the Teacher Retirement System of Texas was a 20-year process which began in 1916, with leadership provided by the Texas State Teachers Association (TSTA). TSTA was the only major organization for Texas teachers in that era. The struggle culminated in three final steps: (1) Passage by the 1935 Legislature of a joint resolution which put a proposed constitutional amendment on the ballot for voters in November 1936; (2) voter approval of the constitutional amendment authorizing the Legislature to pass a law setting up the system; and (3) legislative enactment in 1937 of the "enabling legislation" which put the constitutional amendment into action. Governor James V. Allred signed the bill into law on June 9, 1937 and the Teacher Retirement System of Texas was in effect as of July 1, 1937.
The system is established and operates under Section 67, Article XVI of the Texas Constitution.

While its mission to provide retirement benefits remains essentially unchanged, the breadth of its responsibility has increased considerably.  Originally applicable only to teachers and public school administrators, the system now provides service and disability benefits for employees of public schools, educational service centers, charter schools, community and junior colleges, universities, and medical schools.  A number of events and legislative actions have affected TRS since its inception, including the following:

Timeline

 1936 - Citizens of Texas approve an amendment to the Texas Constitution (Section 48a of Article III) establishing a retirement system for public school employees—the Teacher Retirement System of Texas (TRS).
 1937 - More than 38,000 eligible members participate during TRS’ first year of existence, with assets totaling $2.25 million, and the yield on investments was 2.26%.
 1947 - Legislation increases prior service annuities for active and retired members to 1.5% of the average prior service compensation and provides for vesting of benefits with 25 years of service.
 1949 - TRS retirement plan membership was expanded to include all employees of public education institutions, including cafeteria workers and bus drivers.
 1951 - Increases in retirement benefits for active and retired members are passed by the 52nd Legislature.
 1955 - The first major revision in the retirement law is enacted by the 54th Legislature, contingent upon passage of a constitutional amendment. The law includes a new method of calculating a retirement annuity, increased contribution rates, death and survivor benefit coverage, guaranteed minimum retirement annuities, disability benefits, broader investment authority, lower retirement age requirements, expanded retirement options and the purchase of retirement credit for out of state service.
 1961 - Lawmakers pass what was then the largest teacher salary increase in state history – an $810increase in the minimum beginning salary guaranteed to all teachers.
 1967 - As an alternative to TRS, the Optional Retirement Program (ORP) is designed to offer public higher education faculty more portable retirement programs through individual annuities.
 1967 - The 60th Legislature increases retirement annuities for retired teachers, lowers the vesting provision to 10 years, allows those who served in the military to purchase retirement credit, expands employment after retirement provisions, and further expands survivor benefit coverage.
 1970 - Significant benefit increases occur. 
 1970 - TRS obtains a determination from the U.S. Internal Revenue Service (IRS) that the TRS pension plan is “qualified” under Section 401(a) of the federal tax code. Plan qualification offers certain tax advantages to the member and plan, and imposes certain responsibilities.
 1975 - Benefit increases for retired members are granted by the legislature.
 1985 - The 69th Legislature established TRS-Care, a health benefit program for public school retirees.
 1987 - The plan was amended to take advantage of federal tax code provisions to make member contributions tax deferred.
 1990 - Benefits paid exceed the $1 billion mark.
 1990 - On March 8, a 12-foot tall bronze sculpture titled “Spirit of Learning” is unveiled and dedicated to Texas educators in front of the new TRS building. It was created by sculptor and retired university professor Charles Umlauf of Austin.
 1993 - The 73rd Legislature approves benefit increases equal to a 25% inflation “catch-up,” for retirees whose annuity-purchasing power lags behind the Consumer Price Index (CPI). Also, state law is amended to establish a new credit transfer program for members of TRS and the Employees Retirement System (ERS), thus improving portability between these two systems.
 1994 - TRS’ Benefit payments top $1.5 billion. 
 1995 - The 74th Legislature approves the largest benefit increase in TRS’ history, totaling $1.6 billion. Increase is designed to compensate for payment inequities and to pass along the second Consumer Price Index (CPI) “catch–up” increase.
 1997 - Passage of the Rule of 80 enables unreduced retirement whenever a member's age combined with years of service equal or exceeds 80.
 1997 - New toll-free, automated telephone service (Info Line) operates day and night providing members with information whenever they need it and TRS steps out into cyberspace and launches the TRS website, offering members information 24 hours a day, seven days a week.
 1997 - Annuities were increased for most retirees and beneficiaries. This was the third Consumer Price Index (CPI) increase in recent years designed to help retirees and their beneficiaries catch up on what they had lost to inflation since retirement.
 1999 - Legislation was enacted authorizing TRS to administer an optional long-term care insurance program for eligible active members and retirees.
 2001 - Legislation was enacted to create TRS-ActiveCare, a statewide health benefit program for employees of school districts, open enrollment charter schools, regional education service centers, and other educational districts whose employees are members of TRS. 
 2002 - In 2002, the Trustees of TRS disclosed major losses in the TRS investment portfolio due to large investments in Enron Corporation. At the end of 2001, it was revealed that its (Enron's) reported financial condition was sustained substantially by an institutionalized, systematic, and creatively planned accounting fraud, known since as the Enron scandal.<Wikipedia: Enron Corporation> As a result of these losses in the TRS investment portfolio, TRS Trustees suspended all annual Cost of Living (COLA)adjustments to Retired Teachers receiving pension benefits from TRS. A small adjustment of one extra pension check to retires was paid in 2007. A small COLA was also paid in 2013. Suspension of COLAs continued in 2014 and no change to suspension has been announced as of March 27, 2016.
 2005 - Significant legislation was passed altering several aspects of the plan related to benefit eligibility and determination.  The legislative objective was to help assure the plan's long-term viability by influencing future retirement patterns.
 2006 - For the first time, the TRS fund tops $100 billion.
 2007 - The TRS Board of Trustees adopted a new long-term asset allocation that over time will increase TRS holdings in private markets and reduce holdings in public markets.  This shift in assets is intended to increase investments diversification and returns without increasing risks to the fund.  The Legislature also granted TRS authority to use external investment managers and to use certain investment instruments to help manage risk, enhance returns, and promote efficient portfolio management.
 2007 - Legislation is passed allowing TRS Board to approve issuing a 13th pension check for eligible retirees.
 2008 - Nation faces worst economic conditions since Great Depression. TRS fund experiences significant drop in market value.
 2010 - TRS launches “The Next Generation” (TNG) project, an initiative aimed at improving services the agency provides to members and annuitants. This project is now known as the Teacher Retirement Enterprise Application Modernization (TEAM) Program.
 2010 - MyTRS, a new online access portion of the TRS website, goes live!
 2012 - TRS establishes a presence on Facebook, Twitter, YouTube and LinkedIn .
 2012 - To commemorate the 75th anniversary, a video is produced and made available on the TRS website page which also features an online museum and oral histories. A new agency logo is also introduced.
 2013 - TRS issues COLA to eligible annuitants.
 2017 - TRS adds Instagram to its Social Media presence

Member, beneficiary, and fiduciary services

Primary functions
TRS serves active and retired public and higher education employees of the state through its four core competencies. The plan administers an array of benefits, including service and disability retirement benefits, death and survivor benefits, health benefit programs, and long-term care insurance. It also manages a pension trust fund for the benefit of its members. The trust fund is presently the largest public pension fund in the state and the sixth largest overall in the nation, based on asset size. The fund is established through contributions from the State of Texas and employers (approximately 18.8%), TRS members (approximately 18.2%) and investment returns (approximately 63%) since inception 1938-2017.

Benefit programs
 TRS administers a defined benefit retirement plan that is a qualified pension trust under Section 401(a) of the Internal Revenue Code.  The pension trust fund provides service and disability retirement, as well as death and survivor benefits, to eligible Texas public education employees and their beneficiaries.
 Retirement benefits are financed by member and state contributions, employer contributions in some circumstances, and through investment earnings of the pension trust fund.
 TRS administers TRS-ActiveCare, a statewide health benefit program for eligible public education employees of participating entities.  It is financed by plan participant premium payments and investment income.
 In addition, TRS administers a separate trust that provides health benefit coverage for TRS retirees and eligible dependents.  This program is financed by contributions from the state, active public school employees, reporting entities, premium payments from plan participants, and investment income.
 TRS also administers an optional long-term care insurance program for eligible retirees and public school employees.  Certain family members are also eligible.  The plan is available on an enrollee-pay-all basis.

Health care for public education employees

On September 1, 2002, TRS introduced TRS-ActiveCare, a new statewide health coverage program for public education employees established by the 77th Texas Legislature. Today, participation in that program has grown to over 445,969 employees and dependents. Of the 1,246 districts/entities eligible to participate in TRS-ActiveCare, over 88.9 percent, or 1,108 now do so.

Along with the four PPO plan options administered by Blue Cross Blue Shield of Texas, a part of Health Care Service Corporation, and Medco, there are three health maintenance organization (HMO) options offered under TRS-ActiveCare for the 2011-2012 plan year: FirstCare Health Plans, Scott & White Health Plan, and Valley Baptist Health Plans. These HMO options will provide additional plan choices to the employees of participating entities in areas served by these HMOs. These employees will be able to select TRS-ActiveCare coverage under one of the PPO plans or through the authorized HMO serving their part of the state.

Health care for retirees
TRS-Care is the group retiree health benefits program administered by TRS. TRS retirees who are not eligible for ERS, UT, or Texas A&M system health benefit coverage may be eligible for TRS-Care. More than 233,000 retirees and their dependents participate in this plan. Aetna administers the medical benefits; Express Scripts administers the pharmacy benefits.

TRS-Care is currently funded on a pay-as-you-go basis and is subject to change based on available funding. At the inception of the plan in fiscal year 1986, funding was projected to last ten years through fiscal year 1995. The original funding was sufficient to maintain the solvency of the fund through fiscal year 2000. Since that time, the appropriations and contributions have been established to be sufficient to provide benefits for the biennium. The Texas Legislature determines the funding of benefits and has no continuing obligation to provide benefits beyond each fiscal year.

Long-term care insurance
The TRS first introduced the Group Long Term Care Insurance Program for Public School Employees in 2000, as a result of legislation that is now codified in Chapter 1576, Texas Insurance Code, and TRS Rules.  The group long-term care insurer is always selected by the TRS Trustees following a competitive bidding process.  The current insurer is Genworth Life Insurance Co. (Genworth), a part of Genworth Financial.

Eligible persons between the ages of 18 and 80 include active Texas public school employees who are contributing members of TRS and TRS retirees; their spouses, parents and parents-in-law, and grandparents who are eligible may apply.  Eligible persons must be legal U.S. residents.  All applicants are subject to the underwriting requirements of Genworth.

Cost-of-living adjustment

Unlike Social Security, which offered Cost of Living Allowances from 1975 through 2009 and again from 2013 through 2015, TRS had not been able to provide a COLA to its annuitants since 2001.

In May 2013, during the regular session of the 83rd Texas Legislature, provisions in Senate Bill 1458 resulted in the pension fund being actuarially sound. That soundness and other provisions of the bill allowed legislators to direct TRS to provide a benefit enhancement—a 3% COLA (capped at $100) for members who retired before August 31, 2004. A total of 195,000 retirees received the COLA which began with the annuity payable for September 2013 (effectively paid the next month.) Language in the bill also provides that if the state contribution rate is reduced in the future, active employees’ and ISDs’ contribution rates would be reduced by an equivalent percentage.

In January, 2008, TRS issued a one-time "13th" check to approximately 245,000 eligible retirees. Normally, TRS retirees receive up to 12 pension payments in a year. Eligible annuitants who retired on or before December 31, 2006 received an extra amount equal to their normal monthly pension payment (up to a maximum of $2,400). The TRS Board of Trustees approved the one-time, additional check in November 2007. TRS issued the payment without any increase to the current active member contribution rate.
This was the first time that such an extra annuity payment has been issued by the System. It was made possible thanks to passage of Senate Bill 1846, sponsored by Senator Robert L. Duncan of Lubbock and Representative Vicki Truitt of Southlake. The bill, passed by the 80th Texas Legislature, required the TRS Board of Trustees to approve a supplemental annuity payment based on results of the 2007 actuarial valuation, but only if the resulting funding period to amortize liabilities would be under 31 years after payment of the additional benefit.
The 80th Texas Legislature increased the state contribution rate to the Teacher Retirement System of Texas from 6.0% to 6.58% of employee payroll. This, coupled with investment returns of 14.4% in 2007, yielded an actuarial valuation that allowed the pension trust fund to pay the supplemental payment and still have a funding period under 31 years. More than $372 million was paid to eligible retirees through these supplemental checks.

Senate Inquiry 
In February 2020, Sen. John Whitmire called for inquiries into TRS's real estate investment practices. This comes just days after he lambasted TRS over its aborted plan to lease office space in the luxury Indeed Tower high-rise under construction in downtown Austin.

References

External links

 Teacher Retirement System of Texas

State agencies of Texas
Education in Texas
Organizations based in Austin, Texas
Public pension funds in the United States